This is a list of Egyptian scribes, almost exclusively from the ancient Egyptian periods.

The hieroglyph used to signify the scribe, to write, and "writings", etc., is Gardiner sign Y3, Y3 from the category of: 'writings, games, & music'. The hieroglyph contains the scribe's writing palette, a vertical case to hold writing-reeds, and a leather pouch to hold the colored ink blocks, mostly black and red.

Alphabetic list

This list is incomplete; you can help by expanding it.

Ahmes
Amenemope (author)
Amenemope (Papyrus Anastasi I)
Amenhotep, son of Hapu
Amenmose
Ani, of the Papyrus of Ani for scribe Ani
 Ankhefenamun
Butehamun
Dua-Kheti-("Kheti (scribe)")
Hesy-Ra
Hori
Hunefer
Imiseba 
Kaaper
Ken-Amun
Khakheperresenb
Menna
Meryre II
Mose (scribe)
Nakht
Nakhtmin
Nebamun
Neferhotep
Pediamenopet 
Penthu
Ptahhotep Tshefi
Ramose (TT7)
Reni-seneb – owner of the Chair of Reniseneb 
Roy (Egyptian Noble)
Setau
The Seated Scribe

List of scribes
List of scribes, especially starting with the Old Kingdom of Ancient Egypt.

Theban Tomb list of scribes
Scribes from the Theban Tombs.

TT7–Ramose (TT7)-Scribe in the Place of Truth
TT17–Nebamon-(scribe title)
TT21–User-(scribe title)
TT23–Tjay-(or To)-(scribe title)
TT38–Djeserkaraseneb(Djeser-ka-ra-sen-b)-(scribe+title)
TT49–Neferhotep-(scribe title)
TT52–Nakht-Scribe, "Astronomer of Amun"
TT56–Userhet-(titles)
TT57–Khaemhat-(titles)
TT65–Imiseba/Nebamon-(titles)
TT69–Menna-Scribe of the Fields of the King
TT74–Tjanuny-(titles)
TT79–Amenemhat-(scribe title)
TT80–Tutnefer-(titles)
TT82–Piay-(scribe title)
TT102–"Imhotep"-scribe, etc.
TT107–NefersekherU-(scribe title)
TT136–Unknown-Royal Scribe
TT147–Heby/Unknown-(scribe-etc.)
TT226–Unknown-Royal Scribe
TT255–Roy (Egyptian Noble)-Royal Scibe
TT347–Hon-Scribe
TT350–Unknown-Scribe
TT351–Apau(ApaU)-Scribe of Cavalry
TT364–Amenemheb-(scribe title)
TT365–NefermenU(Nefermenu)-(scribe title)
TT370–Unknown-Royal Scribe
TT373–Amenmessu-(scribe title)
TT374–Amenemopet-Treasury Scribe
TT387–Meryptah-(scribe title)
TT390–Irty-RaU(Irtyrau)-Female Scribe-etc.
TT403–Merymaat-Temple Scribe
TT406–Piay-(scribe title)
TT412–Kenamon-Royal Scribe
(Note: all names ending in "U" show a plural for the last 'hieroglyph "syllable"')

Scribes with block statues 
Scribes honored with a block statue. (The original block statue started with the Tomb of Hetep, Saqqara, 12th Dynasty as two cuboid statues, one each of granite and limestone, and inscriptions explaining the block form, and exposed limbs receiving the first rays of the morning sun-(to arise out of primordial earth). The granite statue represents the daytime sunlit journey, the limestone the night.)

Khay-(scribe)–New Kingdom-Thoth-(tutelary of Scribes)-honored in Shrine-form-(Naos)(at Louvre)
Nebnetro-(scribe)–honors Egyptian God figures: extensive hieroglyph story-(+plinth inscription)
Unknown1-(scribe)–at British Museum

Non-scribe, ancient Egyptians portrayed as "seated scribes"
Prince Setka, son of Djedefra, 4th dynasty; (typical sitting form, with "atypical" Flooring enclosure)
Ramesses I (Paramessu), 18th dynasty (1320s to 1290s BC), vizier during the reign of Horemheb. "Seated scribe", statue remainder, the 'bust'. Shown here: Paramessu

See also
List of Theban Tombs
Theban Necropolis

References

Bate, The Burden of the Past and the English Poet (1970) by Walter Jackson Bate.
Hagen, R. Hagen, R.  Egypt: People, Gods, Pharaohs, Rose-Marie & Rainer Hagen, (Barnes and Noble Books, New York), c 2003, (originally: Taschen, GmbH, Koln, c 2003, 1999); pg. 60; pg. 101.
James, 2000, Tutankhamun, T.G.H. James, Photographs, Araldo de Luca, c 2000, Friedman/Fairfax Publishers. Picture-book, (over-sized), 319 pp. List of Objects, p 316-319, (about 350+). Shabti: "Shabti presented by Minnakhte"-(Nakhtmin), {hardcover, }
Shaw. Shaw, Ian, The Oxford History of Ancient Egypt, Oxford University Press, 2000. (hardcover)

External links

For Hesy-Ra:
Article–(with one panel photo)

|LLL
Scribes
Textual scholarship
Scribes